Pabellón Municipal Rafael Florido is an arena in Almería, Spain.  It is primarily used for team handball and is the home arena of BM Ciudad de Almería.  The arena holds 2,000 people.

Handball venues in Spain
Indoor arenas in Spain
Sports venues in Andalusia